Savin Nunatak is an isolated nunatak 30 nautical miles (60 km) southwest of Mount Vang, rising above the ice plateau at the base of Palmer Land. Mapped by United States Geological Survey (USGS) from surveys and U.S. Navy air photos, 1961–67. Named by Advisory Committee on Antarctic Names (US-ACAN) for Samuel M. Savin, glaciologist at Byrd Station, summer 1965–66.

Nunataks of Palmer Land